The Ironmaster is a 1933 French drama film scripted and supervised by Abel Gance, and directed by Fernand Rivers. It is a remake of the 1912 film Le Maître de forges. In 1948 Rivers himself remade the film.

Cast
 Gaby Morlay as Claire de Beaulieu
 Léon Belières as Monsieur Moulinet
 Paule Andral as Marquise de Beaulieu
 Jacques Dumesnil as Gaston de Bligny
 Henri Rollan as Philippe Derblay
 Rivers Cadet as Baron de Prefont
 Christiane Delyne as Athenais de Moulinet
 Ghislaine Bru as Suzanne Derblay
 Guy Parzy as Octave de Beaulieu
 Irma Génin as Baronne de Prefont
 Jean Dulac
 Jane Marken
 Marcel Maupi

References

External links

1933 films
1933 drama films
French drama films
1930s French-language films
French black-and-white films
Films based on French novels
Films based on works by Georges Ohnet
Films directed by Abel Gance
Remakes of French films
1930s French films